Cannabis in Croatia is decriminalized for personal use and legalized for limited medical uses.

Decriminalization
From 2013, there is a distinction in the Croatian penal code between various illegal substances, they are now separated on heavy drugs and light drugs like cannabis. According to the law, growing or selling cannabis is considered a felony punishable by a mandatory prison sentence (three years minimum). From 2013, the possession of small amount of marijuana and other light drugs is a minor offence which leads to a fine of 5000–20000kn (US$750–3000) depending on the case in question.

Legalization
The political party Human Shield support the full legalization of cannabis in Croatia.

Medical cannabis
As of 15 October 2015, the Ministry of Health officially legalized the use of cannabis-based drugs for medical purposes for patients with illnesses such as cancer, multiple sclerosis, or AIDS.

References

 
Croatia
Politics of Croatia
Drugs in Croatia
Society of Croatia